Canidae (from Latin, canis, "dog") is a biological family of dog-like carnivorans, colloquially referred to as dogs, and constitutes a clade. A member of this family is also called a canid. There are three subfamilies found within the canid family, which are the extinct Borophaginae and Hesperocyoninae, and the extant Caninae. The Caninae are known as canines, and include domestic dogs, wolves, coyotes, foxes, jackals and other extant and extinct species.

Canids are found on all continents except Antarctica, having arrived independently or accompanied human beings over extended periods of time. Canids vary in size from the  gray wolf to the  fennec fox. The body forms of canids are similar, typically having long muzzles, upright ears, teeth adapted for cracking bones and slicing flesh, long legs, and bushy tails. They are mostly social animals, living together in family units or small groups and behaving cooperatively. Typically, only the dominant pair in a group breeds, and a litter of young are reared annually in an underground den. Canids communicate by scent signals and vocalizations. One canid, the domestic dog, originated from a symbiotic relationship with Upper Paleolithic humans and today remains one of the most widely kept domestic animals.

Taxonomy

In the history of the carnivores, the family Canidae is represented by the two extinct subfamilies designated as Hesperocyoninae and Borophaginae, and the extant subfamily Caninae. This subfamily includes all living canids and their most recent fossil relatives. All living canids as a group form a dental monophyletic relationship with the extinct borophagines, with both groups having a bicuspid (two points) on the lower carnassial talonid, which gives this tooth an additional ability in mastication. This, together with the development of a distinct entoconid cusp and the broadening of the talonid of the first lower molar, and the corresponding enlargement of the talon of the upper first molar and reduction of its parastyle distinguish these late Cenozoic canids and are the essential differences that identify their clade.

The cat-like feliformia and dog-like caniforms emerged within the Carnivoramorpha around 45–42 Mya (million years ago). The Canidae first appeared in North America during the Late Eocene (37.8-33.9 Mya). They did not reach Eurasia until the Miocene or to South America until the Late Pliocene.

Phylogenetic relationships
This cladogram shows the phylogenetic position of canids within Caniformia, based on fossil finds:

Evolution

The Canidae today includes a diverse group of some 37 species ranging in size from the maned wolf with its long limbs to the short-legged bush dog. Modern canids inhabit forests, tundra, savannahs, and deserts throughout tropical and temperate parts of the world. The evolutionary relationships between the species have been studied in the past using morphological approaches, but more recently, molecular studies have enabled the investigation of phylogenetics relationships. In some species, genetic divergence has been suppressed by the high level of gene flow between different populations and where the species have hybridized, large hybrid zones exist.

Eocene epoch
Carnivorans evolved after the extinction of the non-avian dinosaurs 66 million years ago. Around 50 million years ago, or earlier, in the Paleocene, the carnivorans split into two main divisions: caniforms (dog-like) and feliforms (cat-like). By 40 Mya, the first identifiable member of the dog family had arisen. Named Prohesperocyon wilsoni, its fossilized remains have been found in what is now the southwestern part of Texas. The chief features which identify it as a canid include the loss of the upper third molar (part of a trend toward a more shearing bite), and the structure of the middle ear which has an enlarged bulla (the hollow bony structure protecting the delicate parts of the ear). Prohesperocyon probably had slightly longer limbs than its predecessors, and also had parallel and closely touching toes which differ markedly from the splayed arrangements of the digits in bears.

The canid family soon subdivided into three subfamilies, each of which diverged during the Eocene: Hesperocyoninae (about 39.74–15 Mya), Borophaginae (about 34–2 Mya), and Caninae (about 34–0 Mya). The Caninae are the only surviving subfamily and all present-day canids, including wolves, foxes, coyotes, jackals, and domestic dogs. Members of each subfamily showed an increase in body mass with time and some exhibited specialized hypercarnivorous diets that made them prone to extinction.

Oligocene epoch
By the Oligocene, all three subfamilies of canids (Hesperocyoninae, Borophaginae, and Caninae) had appeared in the fossil records of North America. The earliest and most primitive branch of the Canidae was the Hesperocyoninae lineage, which included the coyote-sized Mesocyon of the Oligocene (38–24 Mya). These early canids probably evolved for the fast pursuit of prey in a grassland habitat; they resembled modern viverrids in appearance. Hesperocyonines eventually became extinct in the middle Miocene. One of the early members of the Hesperocyonines, the genus Hesperocyon, gave rise to Archaeocyon and Leptocyon. These branches led to the borophagine and canine radiations.

Miocene epoch
Around 9–10 mya during the Late Miocene, the Canis, Urocyon, and Vulpes genera expanded from southwestern North America, where the canine radiation began. The success of these canines was related to the development of lower carnassials that were capable of both mastication and shearing. Around 8 Mya, the Beringian land bridge allowed members of the genus Eucyon a means to enter Asia and they continued on to colonize Europe.

Pliocene epoch
During the Pliocene, around 4–5 Mya, Canis lepophagus appeared in North America. This was small and sometimes coyote-like. Others were wolf-like in characteristics. C. latrans (the coyote) is theorized to have descended from C. lepophagus.

The formation of the Isthmus of Panama, about 3 Mya, joined South America to North America, allowing canids to invade South America, where they diversified. However, the most recent common ancestor of the South American canids lived in North America some 4 Mya and more than one incursion across the new land bridge is likely. One of the resulting lineages consisted of the gray fox (Urocyon cinereoargentus) and the now-extinct dire wolf (Aenocyon dirus). The other lineage consisted of the so-called South American endemic species; the maned wolf (Chrysocyon brachyurus), the short-eared dog (Atelocynus microtis), the bush dog (Speothos venaticus), the crab-eating fox (Cerdocyon thous), and the South American foxes (Lycalopex spp.). The monophyly of this group has been established by molecular means.

Pleistocene epoch
During the Pleistocene, the North American wolf line appeared, with Canis edwardii, clearly identifiable as a wolf, and Canis rufus appeared, possibly a direct descendant of C. edwardii. Around 0.8 Mya, Canis ambrusteri emerged in North America. A large wolf, it was found all over North and Central America and was eventually supplanted by the dire wolf, which then spread into South America during the Late Pleistocene.

By 0.3 Mya, a number of subspecies of the gray wolf (C. lupus) had developed and had spread throughout Europe and northern Asia. The gray wolf colonized North America during the late Rancholabrean era across the Bering land bridge, with at least three separate invasions, with each one consisting of one or more different Eurasian gray wolf clades. MtDNA studies have shown that there are at least four extant C. lupus lineages. The dire wolf shared its habitat with the gray wolf, but became extinct in a large-scale extinction event that occurred around 11,500 years ago. It may have been more of a scavenger than a hunter; its molars appear to be adapted for crushing bones and it may have gone extinct as a result of the extinction of the large herbivorous animals on whose carcasses it relied.

In 2015, a study of mitochondrial genome sequences and whole-genome nuclear sequences of African and Eurasian canids indicated that extant wolf-like canids have colonized Africa from Eurasia at least five times throughout the Pliocene and Pleistocene, which is consistent with fossil evidence suggesting that much of African canid fauna diversity resulted from the immigration of Eurasian ancestors, likely coincident with Plio-Pleistocene climatic oscillations between arid and humid conditions. When comparing the African and Eurasian golden jackals, the study concluded that the African specimens represented a distinct monophyletic lineage that should be recognized as a separate species, Canis anthus (African golden wolf). According to a phylogeny derived from nuclear sequences, the Eurasian golden jackal (Canis aureus) diverged from the wolf/coyote lineage 1.9 Mya, but the African golden wolf separated 1.3 Mya. Mitochondrial genome sequences indicated the Ethiopian wolf diverged from the wolf/coyote lineage slightly prior to that.

Wild canids are found on every continent except Antarctica, and inhabit a wide range of different habitats, including deserts, mountains, forests, and grasslands. Only a few species are arboreal—the gray fox, the closely related island fox and the raccoon dog habitually climb trees.

All canids have a similar basic form, as exemplified by the gray wolf, although the relative length of muzzle, limbs, ears, and tail vary considerably between species. With the exceptions of the bush dog, the raccoon dog and some domestic dog breeds, canids have relatively long legs and lithe bodies, adapted for chasing prey. The tails are bushy and the length and quality of the pelage vary with the season. The muzzle portion of the skull is much more elongated than that of the cat family. The zygomatic arches are wide, there is a transverse lambdoidal ridge at the rear of the cranium and in some species, a sagittal crest running from front to back. The bony orbits around the eye never form a complete ring and the auditory bullae are smooth and rounded. Females have three to seven pairs of mammae.

All canids are digitigrade, meaning they walk on their toes. The tip of the nose is always naked, as are the cushioned pads on the soles of the feet. These latter consist of a single pad behind the tip of each toe and a more-or-less three-lobed central pad under the roots of the digits. Hairs grow between the pads and in the Arctic fox the sole of the foot is densely covered with hair at some times of the year. With the exception of the four-toed African wild dog (Lycaon pictus), five toes are on the forefeet, but the pollex (thumb) is reduced and does not reach the ground. On the hind feet are four toes, but in some domestic dogs, a fifth vestigial toe, known as a dewclaw, is sometimes present, but has no anatomical connection to the rest of the foot. In some species, slightly curved nails are non-retractile and more-or-less blunt while other species have sharper, partially-retractile claws.

The penis in male canids is supported by a baculum and contains a structure called the bulbus glandis, which creates a copulatory tie that lasts for up to an hour during mating. Young canids are born blind, with their eyes opening a few weeks after birth. All living canids (Caninae) have a ligament analogous to the nuchal ligament of ungulates used to maintain the posture of the head and neck with little active muscle exertion; this ligament allows them to conserve energy while running long distances following scent trails with their nose to the ground. However, based on skeletal details of the neck, at least some of the Borophaginae (such as Aelurodon) are believed to have lacked this ligament.

Dentition

Dentition relates to the arrangement of teeth in the mouth, with the dental notation for the upper-jaw teeth using the upper-case letters I to denote incisors, C for canines, P for premolars, and M for molars, and the lower-case letters i, c, p and m to denote the mandible teeth. Teeth are numbered using one side of the mouth and from the front of the mouth to the back. In carnivores, the upper premolar P4 and the lower molar m1 form the carnassials that are used together in a scissor-like action to shear the muscle and tendon of prey.

Canids use their premolars for cutting and crushing except for the upper fourth premolar P4 (the upper carnassial) that is only used for cutting. They use their molars for grinding except for the lower first molar m1 (the lower carnassial) that has evolved for both cutting and grinding depending on the canid's dietary adaptation. On the lower carnassial, the trigonid is used for slicing and the talonid is used for grinding. The ratio between the trigonid and the talonid indicates a carnivore's dietary habits, with a larger trigonid indicating a hypercarnivore and a larger talonid indicating a more omnivorous diet. Because of its low variability, the length of the lower carnassial is used to provide an estimate of a carnivore's body size.

A study of the estimated bite force at the canine teeth of a large sample of living and fossil mammalian predators, when adjusted for their body mass, found that for placental mammals the bite force at the canines  was greatest in the extinct dire wolf (163), followed among the modern canids by the four hypercarnivores that often prey on animals larger than themselves: the African wild dog (142), the gray wolf (136), the dhole (112), and the dingo (108). The bite force at the carnassials showed a similar trend to the canines. A predator's largest prey size is strongly influenced by its biomechanical limits.

Most canids have 42 teeth, with a dental formula of: . The bush dog has only one upper molar with two below, the dhole has two above and two below. and the bat-eared fox has three or four upper molars and four lower ones. The molar teeth are strong in most species, allowing the animals to crack open bone to reach the marrow.

Life history

Social behavior

Almost all canids are social animals and live together in groups. In general, they are territorial or have a home range and sleep in the open, using their dens only for breeding and sometimes in bad weather. In most foxes, and in many of the true dogs, a male and female pair work together to hunt and to raise their young. Gray wolves and some of the other larger canids live in larger groups called packs. African wild dogs have packs which may consist of 20 to 40 animals and packs of fewer than about seven individuals may be incapable of successful reproduction. Hunting in packs has the advantage that larger prey items can be tackled. Some species form packs or live in small family groups depending on the circumstances, including the type of available food. In most species, some individuals live on their own. Within a canid pack, there is a system of dominance so that the strongest, most experienced animals lead the pack. In most cases, the dominant male and female are the only pack members to breed.

Canids communicate with each other by scent signals, by visual clues and gestures, and by vocalizations such as growls, barks, and howls. In most cases, groups have a home territory from which they drive out other conspecifics. The territory is marked by leaving urine scent marks, which warn trespassing individuals. Social behavior is also mediated by secretions from glands on the upper surface of the tail near its root and from the anal glands, preputial glands, and supracaudal glands.

Reproduction

Canids as a group exhibit several reproductive traits that are uncommon among mammals as a whole. They are typically monogamous, provide paternal care to their offspring, have reproductive cycles with lengthy proestral and dioestral phases and have a copulatory tie during mating. They also retain adult offspring in the social group, suppressing the ability of these to breed while making use of the alloparental care they can provide to help raise the next generation of offspring. Most canid species are spontaneous ovulators, although maned wolves are induced ovulators. 

During the proestral period, increased levels of estradiol make the female attractive to the male. There is a rise in progesterone during the estral phase when female is receptive. Following this, the level of estradiol fluctuates and there is a lengthy dioestrous phase during which the female is pregnant. Pseudo-pregnancy frequently occurs in canids that have ovulated but failed to conceive. A period of anestrus follows pregnancy or pseudo-pregnancy, there being only one oestral period during each breeding season. Small and medium-sized canids mostly have a gestation period of 50 to 60 days, while larger species average 60 to 65 days. The time of year in which the breeding season occurs is related to the length of day, as has been demonstrated in the case of several species that have been translocated across the equator to the other hemisphere and experiences a six-month shift of phase. Domestic dogs and certain small canids in captivity may come into oestrus more frequently, perhaps because the photoperiod stimulus breaks down under conditions of artificial lighting.

The size of a litter varies, with from one to 16 or more pups being born. The young are born small, blind and helpless and require a long period of parental care. They are kept in a den, most often dug into the ground, for warmth and protection. When the young begin eating solid food, both parents, and often other pack members, bring food back for them from the hunt. This is most often vomited up from the adult's stomach. Where such pack involvement in the feeding of the litter occurs, the breeding success rate is higher than is the case where females split from the group and rear their pups in isolation. Young canids may take a year to mature and learn the skills they need to survive. In some species, such as the African wild dog, male offspring usually remain in the natal pack, while females disperse as a group and join another small group of the opposite sex to form a new pack.

Canids and humans

One canid, the domestic dog, entered into a partnership with humans a long time ago. The dog was the first domesticated species. The archaeological record shows the first undisputed dog remains buried beside humans 14,700 years ago, with disputed remains occurring 36,000 years ago. These dates imply that the earliest dogs arose in the time of human hunter-gatherers and not agriculturists.

The fact that wolves are pack animals with cooperative social structures may have been the reason that the relationship developed. Humans benefited from the canid's loyalty, cooperation, teamwork, alertness and tracking abilities, while the wolf may have benefited from the use of weapons to tackle larger prey and the sharing of food. Humans and dogs may have evolved together.

Among canids, only the gray wolf has widely been known to prey on humans. Nonetheless, at least two records of coyotes killing humans have been published, and at least two other reports of golden jackals killing children. Human beings have trapped and hunted some canid species for their fur and some, especially the gray wolf, the coyote and the red fox, for sport. Canids such as the dhole are now endangered in the wild because of persecution, habitat loss, a depletion of ungulate prey species and transmission of diseases from domestic dogs.

See also

Largest wild canids
Canid hybrid
Free-ranging dog

References

Bibliography

External links

 

 
Mammal families
Bartonian first appearances
Extant Eocene first appearances
Taxa named by Gotthelf Fischer von Waldheim